Tomasz Bzdęga (born March 18, 1985 in Gostyń) is a Polish footballer who plays for Polish side Elana Toruń.

Club career
In February 2011, he signed a one-year contract with KSZO Ostrowiec.

In June 2011, he joined Piast Gliwice.

References

External links 
 
 

1985 births
Living people
ŁKS Łomża players
Polish footballers
Warta Poznań players
Unia Janikowo players
Znicz Pruszków players
KSZO Ostrowiec Świętokrzyski players
Piast Gliwice players
OKS Stomil Olsztyn players
People from Gostyń
Sportspeople from Greater Poland Voivodeship
Association football forwards